B-2 status can refer to:

A tourist or transit visa granted by South Korea
A tourist visa granted by the United States of America

See also
 B2 (disambiguation), for other meanings of B-2 
 B-2, for the current stealth bomber status